The 1901 New Zealand Royal Visit Honours were appointments by Edward VII of New Zealanders to the Order of St Michael and St George, to mark the visit of the Duke and Duchess of Cornwall and York to New Zealand that year. They were announced on 19 June 1901.

The recipients of honours are displayed here as they were styled before their new honour.

Order of St Michael and St George

Knight Grand Cross (GCMG)
 The Right Honourable The Earl of Ranfurly  – Governor and Commander-in-Chief of the Colony of New Zealand.

Knight Commander (KCMG)
 The Honourable Joseph George Ward – Postmaster-General.
 The Honourable John McKenzie – late Minister of Lands.

Companion (CMG)
 The Honourable Alfred Jerome Cadman – late Minister for Railways.
 The Honourable William Campbell Walker – Minister of Education.
 Lieutenant-Colonel Walter Edward Gudgeon – British Resident at Rarotonga, in the Cook Islands.

References

1901 awards
Royal Visit Honours
Monarchy in New Zealand